Maziarnia  (Maziarnia) is a village in the administrative district of Gmina Harasiuki, within Nisko County, Subcarpathian Voivodeship, in south-eastern Poland.

References

Maziarnia